Taproot is an American alternative metal band from Ann Arbor, Michigan, formed in 1997. They are best known for their hit single "Poem", which peaked at #5 on the Mainstream Rock chart in 2002, as well as a number of other singles from 2000 on.

History

Formation and independent releases (1997–1999)
Taproot was formed in 1997 in Ann Arbor, Michigan by vocalist Stephen Richards, guitarist Mike DeWolf, bassist Phil Lipscomb, and drummer Jarrod Montague. The band earned a following with their live performances. Shortly after forming, they recorded their first demos at Woodshed Studios in Oak Park, Michigan, with Tim Pak. In 1998, Taproot sent their demo to Limp Bizkit frontman, Fred Durst, after seeing a request for demos on their first album. Impressed with the material, Durst offered to get Taproot a recording contract through Interscope Records. However, after extended negotiations, Taproot decided to look elsewhere and finally landed a record deal with Atlantic Records. Durst heavily cursed the band on vocalist Stephen Richards' answering machine.

Durst also allegedly put some blame on System of a Down, who assisted Taproot in securing the Atlantic deal. It is also alleged that Durst kicked System of a Down off the 1999 Family Values Tour. Taproot independently released the album ...Something More Than Nothing (1998), the EP Mentobe (1998), and the album Upon Us (1999) around this time.

Gift and Welcome (2000–2004)
Taproot released their major label debut album, Gift, on June 27, 2000, through Atlantic Records. With the album's lead single, "Again & Again", gaining heavy exposure through MTV2, the band's mainstream rise gained momentum. With the help of Ozzy Osbourne's son Jack, Taproot landed a spot on the second stage of the 2000 and 2001 Ozzfest tour.

After spending seven months in Los Angeles, the band released their second album, Welcome, on October 15, 2002. Considered to be a more melodic effort, the album debuted at No. 17 on the Billboard 200, selling over 51,000 copies in its first week of release. Much of this was due to the success of the album's first single, "Poem", which shot to No. 5 on the Mainstream Rock charts. "Poem" did not enter the Billboard Hot 100 but peaked at number 6 on the Bubbling Under Hot 100 Singles chart, which acts as a 25-song extension to the Hot 100. The album's second single, "Mine", followed with more moderate success. Welcome is Taproot's most successful album to date, achieving Gold status, with over 500,000 copies sold.

After touring across the country on Disturbed's Music as a Weapon Tour, as well as a European tour, Taproot took a two-year break.

Blue-Sky Research (2005–2006)

Returning from their hiatus, Taproot released their third studio album, Blue-Sky Research, on August 16, 2005. Billy Corgan of Smashing Pumpkins assisted in songwriting on the album, which was produced by Toby Wright. It debuted at No. 33 on the Billboard 200, with approximately 28,000 first-week sales. The single "Calling" (written with Jonah Matranga), was used by WWE as the theme song for the 2005 pay-per-view "Unforgiven".

Taproot headlined a major tour with Evans Blue and From Satellite to promote the album's release. Prior to the this, the band acted as direct support to Chevelle on their tour alongside Thirty Seconds to Mars. They also participated in the Fall Brawl Tour, which featured Staind and P.O.D. as headliners and is notable for taking the then-unknown Flyleaf along as the opening act for the three bands.

On May 23, 2006, it was reported that Taproot had parted ways with Atlantic Records after disappointing sales of Blue-Sky Research. At the time, the album had sold 112,000 copies since its release.

Our Long Road Home and Montague's departure (2007–2009)
On March 5, 2007, Taproot confirmed that they were in the process of recording their new album, Our Long Road Home, with producer Tim Patalan.

On March 2, 2008, the band released a song from Our Long Road Home entitled "You're Not Home Tonight" on their website.

A teaser trailer for Our Long Road Home was added to the Taproot YouTube page on April 28, 2008. At the end of the video, it was stated that the album would be released on August 5, 2008.

According to the Taproot website, the band decided to forgo signing to a major label. The new album would be released independently through their management firm, Velvet Hammer Music, in a 50/50 partnership with the band themselves. Distribution was handled by Sony-owned RED Distribution.

Our Long Road Home was released on September 16, 2008. Just over a week after its publication, it was announced that long-time drummer, Jarrod Montague, would be leaving the band and replaced by Nick Fredell. Taproot released a statement regarding the change in lineup:
"After 10 years of touring, our drummer and good friend Jarrod will be sitting out this cycle and we will be replacing him with our long time friend Nick Fredell. We'll miss Jarrod's presence out on the road, but Nick has fit in perfectly and we're excited for all of our fans to meet him. Jarrod's still very much a part of our family, so you'll be seeing him in press and the 'Wherever I Stand' video which is out now on Youtube..."

In the spring of 2009, Taproot went on the road with Dear Enemy and Adakain for the Take It! tour. Later that year, they co-headlined a U.S. tour with Cold, in addition to releasing the following statement: "Taproot has a few upcoming shows in November and December and will start writing their new record in January/ February 2010. We hope to get into the studio sometime in February and March. We will be looking at a release date sometime in the late spring possibly early summer of 2010!"

Plead the Fifth and The Episodes (2010–2012)
After a brief period without a record label, Taproot signed with Victory Records. On April 1, 2010, the band released the lead single from their upcoming album. The song was titled "Fractured (Everything I Said Was True)". A video followed, debuting on the band's YouTube channel on April 16. Soon after, the band released their fifth studio album, Plead the Fifth.

Taproot supported Plead the Fifth with a headlining run in the summer of 2010, with support from Ice Nine Kills and label-mates Destrophy.

In September 2011, Taproot announced they were preparing to record their sixth studio album, working with producer Tim Patalan once again and recording at The Loft Studios in Saline, Michigan. On December 15, the band announced that the album was recorded and should be released in the spring of 2012. On January 8, 2012, the band's official website was closed and re-launched as a brand new one on February 7, 2012. In addition to the new site, the band also revealed that The Episodes would be released on April 10, 2012. During the following weeks, Taproot offered a video every Tuesday about their upcoming album. On March 2, 2012, they issued the first single, titled "No Surrender".

In an October 14, 2012 interview, Stephen Richards spoke candidly about his bout with seizures and how his medical issues had affected touring and onstage performances. Taproot supported The Episodes with a headlining Winter Riot Tour (with 12 Stones, Digital Summer, 3 Pill Morning, and Prospect Hill).

Gift 13th anniversary, Fredell and DeWolf's departure (2013–2015)
The first half of 2013 saw Taproot touring in celebration of the thirteenth anniversary of their debut album, Gift, by playing it in its entirety on tour.

On June 16, 2013, drummer Nick Fredell announced on his Twitter account that he had departed the band, citing "some bad blood". He was replaced by Dave Coughlin. The band did not issue an official statement addressing this.

On July 9, 2015, a statement was released by Phil Lipscomb, stating that Mike DeWolf was not interested in continuing with the band, and that he and Stephen would be proceeding without him.

On August 4, 2015, the Alice in Chains book Alice in Chains: The Untold Story was released, and it mentions an unfinished collaboration between original frontman Layne Staley and Taproot. Just prior to his death from an overdose, Staley was set to record vocals for a Taproot song that was written for their 2002 album, Welcome.

On August 8, 2015, Taproot played at Dirt Fest in Birch Run, Michigan, with Dave Lizzio, formerly of Nonpoint, as the band's guitarist. The performance was also notable for its guest appearance of founding member Jarrod Montague, as well as being their first show since the departure of Mike DeWolf.

Besides and anniversary shows (2016–present)
On September 6, 2016, Taproot announced that they would be releasing a rarities collection entitled Besides. 

On February 27, 2017, they announced on Banana 101.5 that they would play "Welcome" in its entirety. Original drummer Jarrod Montague would also appear on the anniversary concert, along with his band WestFall as the opening act.   Taproot performed on May 13 and 14, 2017, at the Machine Shop in Flint, Michigan. During the concert, they premiered a new song entitled "No One Else to Blame".

On October 16, 2017, the band announced a twentieth-anniversary show and performed on December 23 at Token Lounge in Westland, Michigan. Jarrod Montague played drums on older songs, while current drummer Dave Coughlin performed more recent material. As of January 2018, the band has been recording their upcoming seventh studio album. The compilation Besides was released as an eight-disc, 130-track box set in December 2018. A CD version of Besides, titled Best of Besides, is set to be released on April 30, 2023, with a double LP vinyl set to follow on September 30. The compilation will contain remastered versions of eighteen tracks from the Besides box set.

In February 2023, Taproot announced that they would be releasing a new album, titled SC\SSRS, on September 29. This would be their first studio release since 2012's The Episodes.

Musical style and influences
Taproot's influences include Alice in Chains, Faith No More, and Van Halen. In 2001, the band were announced to be contributing a cover of the song "Ricochet" for a Faith No More tribute album, but the project never came to fruition. Their sound has been compared to Deftones, Fugazi, Helmet, Korn, and Tool.

Band members
Current
 Stephen Richards – lead vocals, rhythm guitar (1997–present)
 Phil Lipscomb – bass (1997–present)
 Dave Coughlin – drums (2013–present)
 Dave Lizzio – lead guitar (2015–present)

Past
 Jarrod Montague – drums, backing vocals (1997–2008; guest: 2013, 2015, 2017)
 Nick Fredell – drums (2008–2013)
 Mike DeWolf – lead guitar (1997–2015)

Timeline

Discography

 Gift (2000)
 Welcome (2002)
 Blue-Sky Research (2005)
 Our Long Road Home (2008)
 Plead the Fifth (2010)
 The Episodes (2012)
 SC\SSRS (2023)

References

External links
 Taproot on Victory Records
 

Musical groups from Michigan
Music of Ann Arbor, Michigan
American nu metal musical groups
Musical groups established in 1997
American post-grunge musical groups
Atlantic Records artists
Victory Records artists
1997 establishments in Michigan
American alternative metal musical groups
Heavy metal musical groups from Michigan
Alternative rock groups from Michigan